Donald Frederick Griffin (born March 17, 1964 in Pelham, Georgia) is a former professional American football player who was drafted by the San Francisco 49ers in the sixth round of the 1986 NFL Draft.  A 6'0", 176-lb. cornerback from Middle Tennessee State University.

Career
Griffin played in 11 NFL seasons from 1986 to 1996.  A two-time Super Bowl winner with the 49ers in 1988 and 1989, Griffin also played with the Cleveland Browns from 1994 to 1995 and the Philadelphia Eagles in 1996.

The 49ers defense he was part of in 1987 allowed the fewest total yards (4,095/273 per game) and fewest passing yards (2,484/165.6 per game) of any NFL team.

The Browns defense he was part of in 1994 allowed the fewest points in the NFL (204/12.75 per game).

The only team with a losing record he played for was the 1995 Cleveland Browns (5-11).

External links
Career statistics and player information from Pro Football Reference

1964 births
Living people
American football cornerbacks
Middle Tennessee Blue Raiders football players
San Francisco 49ers players
Cleveland Browns players
Philadelphia Eagles players
People from Mitchell County, Georgia
Players of American football from Georgia (U.S. state)
Ed Block Courage Award recipients